Terence M. Zaleski (born 1953) is an American politician from New York who was the 39th Mayor of Yonkers, New York. He took office on January 1, 2004, after serving the previous five years in the New York State Assembly.

Early life and education
Zaleski graduated from Columbia Law School with a J.D. degree. He worked as a high school chemistry teacher.

Career
He was a member of the New York State Assembly from 1987 to 1991, sitting in the 187th, 188th and 189th New York State Legislatures.

In the 1988 election, he was re-elected with 56% of the vote.

During his time in the Assembly, he chaired a committee on the use of DNA tests in court cases.

He was mayor of Yonkers from 1992 to 1995.

Personal life
Zaleski's wife, Lynn, served as his campaign treasurer. They have at least one child, a son named Terence.

References

1953 births
Living people
American politicians of Polish descent
Mayors of Yonkers, New York
Columbia Law School alumni
Politicians from Westchester County, New York
Democratic Party members of the New York State Assembly
20th-century American politicians
Columbia College (New York) alumni
Teachers College, Columbia University alumni